Mercogliano is an Italian town and comune in the province of Avellino, Campania, southern Italy.

Geography
Mercogliano is a hill town located near the western suburb of Avellino and below the mount Partenio (or Montevergine). The municipality  borders with Avellino, Monteforte Irpino, Mugnano del Cardinale, Ospedaletto d'Alpinolo, Quadrelle and Summonte.

It counts three hamlets (frazioni):
Montevergine: located near the summit of mount Partenio and home of the homonym sanctuary, is linked to Mercogliano by the Montevergine funicular. 
Torelli: it is a village located on the road between Torrette and Mercogliano.
Torrette: located on a plain next to Avellino, it is the commercial hub of the municipality. The exit "Avellino Ovest" (Av. West) of the A16 motorway serves the locality.

Main sights 
Catholic Sanctuary of Montevergine
Loreto Abbey Palace near Torelli

See also
Montevergine funicular
Pacello da Mercogliano

References

External links

Official website 

Cities and towns in Campania